Hrabovec is a village and municipality in the Bardejov District, Prešov Region of north-east Slovakia.

In historical records the village was first mentioned in 1353.

Geography 
The municipality lies at an altitude of 460 metres and covers an area of 10.905 km².
It has a population of about 545 people.

Genealogical resources 
The records for genealogical research are available at the state archive "Statny Archiv in Presov, Slovakia"
 Roman Catholic church records (births/marriages/deaths): 1789-1897 (parish B)
 Greek Catholic church records (births/marriages/deaths): 1753-1906 (parish A)

See also
 List of municipalities and towns in Slovakia

References

External links
 
 Surnames of living people in Hrabovec

Villages and municipalities in Bardejov District
Šariš
Shtetls